Pai Airport  is an airport serving Pai, a town in Mae Hong Son Province, Thailand. Originally constructed during World War II by the Japanese Imperial Army, the airport was deserted after the end of the war and was developed by the province in 1945 for civil aviation.

Located on a 72.3-rai area around a kilometre away from Mueang Mae Hong Son, the capital district of the province, the airport has one runway (23 metres wide, 1,000 metres long)

In early 2017, an expansion of the airport was considered by the government to increase tourism, but was ultimately denied after opposition from locals.

Airlines and destinations
Since Kan Air discontinued all flights in April 2017, there has been no scheduled commercial airline service to Pai.

In May 2018, a new carrier called Wisdom Airways announced plans to fly from Pai to Chiang Mai. A year later, the airline stopped all flights when it ceased all operations in 2019.

References

External links

Airports in Thailand
Buildings and structures in Mae Hong Son province
Airports established in 1945